The Gay Academic Union (GAU) was a group of LGBT academics who aimed at making the academia more amenable to the LGBT community in the United States. It was formed in April 1973, just four years after the Stonewall riots, held 4 yearly conferences (the last in November, 1976) and conducted other scholarly activities. It disbanded some time after that.

History
Members included Martin Duberman, Bertha Harris, Karla Jay, Jonathan Dunn-Rankin, John D'Emilio, Joan Nestle, Jonathan Ned Katz, Barbara Gittings, George Whitmore, Andrea Dworkin, Dawn M. Atkins and Michael Lynch. They held their first conference on November 23 and 24, 1973, at John Jay College of Criminal Justice - City University of New York in New York City.

Martin Duberman remembers that lesbians were often discriminated against by other white male homosexuals. He recalls an argument with George Whitmore. The Lesbian Herstory Archives were founded in 1974 by lesbian members of the Gay Academic Union who had organized a group to discuss sexism within that organization. Co-founders Joan Nestle, Deborah Edel, Sahli Cavallo, Pamela Oline, and Julia Stanley wanted to ensure that the stories of the lesbian community were protected for future generations.

By 1975, many radicals had left the group and conferences were moved to Los Angeles, although Wayne R. Dynes and others stayed in New York. The 1976 conference, however, was held at Columbia University in New York City.

Jonathan Dunn-Rankin was National President from 1981-1987 and traveled from city to city trying to organize all the chapters together.

References

Defunct LGBT organizations based in New York City
LGBT studies organizations
Organizations established in 1973
1973 in LGBT history
1973 establishments in New York City